= Michael Linares =

Michael Linares (born 1979) is a Puerto Rican conceptual artist.
